The groove-toothed flying squirrel or North Chinese flying squirrel (Aeretes melanopterus) is a species of rodent in the family Sciuridae. It is monotypic within the genus Aeretes.
It is endemic to China, and occurs in Sichuan, Gansu, Hebei, and Beijing.
Its natural habitat is temperate forests.

See also
List of endangered and protected species of China

References

Thorington, R. W. Jr. and R. S. Hoffman. 2005. Family Sciuridae. pp. 754–818 in Mammal Species of the World a Taxonomic and Geographic Reference. D. E. Wilson and D. M. Reeder eds. Johns Hopkins University Press, Baltimore.

Flying squirrels
Rodents of China
Mammals described in 1867
Taxonomy articles created by Polbot